Leslie George Gregory (13 June 1915 – 29 May 1999) was an Australian rules footballer who played with Carlton in the Victorian Football League (VFL). He was a member of the Air Force, and played for many different clubs as he was posted to different areas before playing with Carlton in the VFL. Reaching the rank of Warrant Officer, he was discharged in October 1945.

Notes

External links 

Les Gregory's profile at Blueseum

1915 births
1999 deaths
Carlton Football Club players
Albury Football Club players
Australian rules footballers from New South Wales